Paulo Armando da Silva Monteiro (born 21 January 1985) is a Portuguese footballer who plays for AD Fafe as a central defender.

Club career
Born in Guimarães, Monteiro finished his formation at S.C. Braga, making his senior debuts with the reserves in the third division. On 5 November 2005 he played his first official game with the first team, coming on as a substitute for injured Paulo Jorge in the 30th minute of a 0–1 away loss against C.S. Marítimo; it would be his only Primeira Liga appearance in ten years.

From 2006 to 2008, Monteiro played abroad, but only managed to appear in two league matches combined for FC Istres (Ligue 2), FC Farul Constanţa (Liga I) and Charlton Athletic in the Football League Championship. During his spell with the Addicks he was also pursued by lowly Accrington Stanley, but the deal fell through due to lack of international clearance, and he was released in July 2008 without any official appearances.

Returned to his country, Monteiro played four seasons in the third level, with Amarante FC, Gondomar SC, S.C. Praiense and S.C. Espinho. He joined division two side C.D. Santa Clara in 2012–13, moving to fellow league team Académico de Viseu F.C. for the following campaign.

In June 2015, after a very brief spell in Romania, Monteiro signed with C.F. União, newly promoted to the top flight. On 18 October, in a Taça de Portugal third-round tie against Sertanense FC, he scored a hat-trick of penalties in a 5–1 away win.

On 30 June 2016, after suffering relegation, Monteiro joined C.D. Feirense also in the top tier on a one-year contract.

International career
Three youth categories comprised, Monteiro won 21 caps for Portugal, including 11 for the under-20s.

References

External links

1985 births
Living people
Sportspeople from Guimarães
Portuguese footballers
Association football defenders
Primeira Liga players
Liga Portugal 2 players
Segunda Divisão players
S.C. Braga B players
S.C. Braga players
Amarante F.C. players
Gondomar S.C. players
S.C. Praiense players
S.C. Espinho players
C.D. Santa Clara players
Académico de Viseu F.C. players
G.D. Chaves players
C.F. União players
C.D. Feirense players
Real S.C. players
C.D. Mafra players
AD Fafe players
Ligue 2 players
FC Istres players
FCV Farul Constanța players
CS Concordia Chiajna players
Charlton Athletic F.C. players
Portugal youth international footballers
Portuguese expatriate footballers
Expatriate footballers in France
Expatriate footballers in Romania
Expatriate footballers in England
Portuguese expatriate sportspeople in France
Portuguese expatriate sportspeople in Romania
Portuguese expatriate sportspeople in England